5000 (five thousand) is the natural number following 4999 and preceding 5001. Five thousand is the largest isogrammic number in the English language.

Selected numbers in the range 5001–5999

5001 to 5099
 5003 – Sophie Germain prime
 5020 – amicable number with 5564
 5021 – super-prime, twin prime with 5023
 5023 – twin prime with 5021
 5039 – factorial prime, Sophie Germain prime
 5040 = 7!, superior highly composite number
 5041 = 712, centered octagonal number
 5050 – triangular number, Kaprekar number, sum of first 100 integers
 5051 – Sophie Germain prime
 5059 – super-prime
 5076 – decagonal number
 5081 – Sophie Germain prime
 5087 – safe prime
 5099 – safe prime

5100 to 5199
 5107 – super-prime, balanced prime
 5113 – balanced prime
 5117 – sum of the first 50 primes
 5151 – triangular number
 5167 – Leonardo prime, cuban prime of the form x = y + 1
 5171 – Sophie Germain prime
 5184 = 722
 5186 – φ(5186) = 2592
 5187 – φ(5187) = 2592
 5188 – φ(5189) = 2592, centered heptagonal number
 5189 – super-prime

5200 to 5299 

 5209 - largest minimal prime in base 6
 5226 – nonagonal number
 5231 – Sophie Germain prime
 5244 = 222 + 232 + … + 292 = 202 + 212 + … + 282
 5249 – highly cototient number
 5253 – triangular number
 5279 – Sophie Germain prime, twin prime with 5281, 700th prime number
 5280 is the number of feet in a mile. It is divisible by three, yielding 1760 yards per mile and by 16.5, yielding 320 rods per mile. Also, 5280 is connected with both Klein's J-invariant and the Heegner numbers. Specifically:

 5281 – super-prime, twin prime with 5279
 5282 - used in various paintings by Thomas Kinkade
 5292 – Kaprekar number

5300 to 5399
 5303 – Sophie Germain prime, balanced prime
 5329 = 732, centered octagonal number
 5333 – Sophie Germain prime
 5335 – magic constant of n × n normal magic square and n-queens problem for n = 22.
 5340 – octahedral number
 5356 – triangular number
 5365 – decagonal number
 5381 – super-prime
 5387 – safe prime, balanced prime
 5392 – Leyland number
 5393 – balanced prime
 5399 – Sophie Germain prime, safe prime

5400 to 5499
 5402 – number of ways in which one million can be expressed as the sum of two prime numbers
 5405 – member of a Ruth–Aaron pair with 5406 (either definition)
 5406 – member of a Ruth–Aaron pair with 5405 (either definition)
 5419 – Cuban prime of the form x = y + 1
 5441 – Sophie Germain prime, super-prime
 5456 – tetrahedral number
 5459 – highly cototient number
 5460 – triangular number
 5461 – super-Poulet number, centered heptagonal number
 5476 = 742
 5483 – safe prime

5500 to 5599
 5500 – nonagonal number
 5501 – Sophie Germain prime, twin prime with 5503
 5503 – super-prime, twin prime with 5501, cousin prime with 5507
 5507 – safe prime, cousin prime with 5503
 5525 – square pyramidal number
 5527 – happy prime
 5536 – tetranacci number
 5557 – super-prime
 5563 – balanced prime
 5564 – amicable number with 5020
 5565 – triangular number
 5566 – pentagonal pyramidal number
 5569 – happy prime
 5571 – perfect totient number
 5581 – prime of the form 2p-1

5600 to 5699
 5623 – super-prime
 5625 = 752, centered octagonal number
 5631 – number of compositions of 15 whose run-lengths are either weakly increasing or weakly decreasing
 5639 – Sophie Germain prime, safe prime
 5651 – super-prime
 5659 – happy prime, completes the eleventh prime quadruplet set
 5662 – decagonal number
 5671 – triangular number

5700 to 5799
 5701 – super-prime
 5711 – Sophie Germain prime
 5719 – Zeisel number, Lucas–Carmichael number
 5741 – Sophie Germain prime, Pell prime, Markov prime, centered heptagonal number
 5749 – super-prime
 5768 – tribonacci number
 5776 = 762
 5777 – smallest counterexample to the conjecture that all odd numbers are of the form p + 2a2
 5778 – triangular number
 5781 – nonagonal number
 5798 – Motzkin number

5800 to 5899
 5801 – super-prime
 5807 – safe prime, balanced prime
 5832 = 183
 5842 – member of the Padovan sequence
 5849 – Sophie Germain prime
 5869 – super-prime
 5879 – safe prime, highly cototient number
 5886 – triangular number

5900 to 5999
 5903 – Sophie Germain prime 
 5913 – sum of the first seven factorials
 5927 – safe prime
 5929 = 772, centered octagonal number
 5939 – safe prime
 5967 – decagonal number
 5984 – tetrahedral number
 5995 – triangular number

Prime numbers
There are 114 prime numbers between 5000 and 6000:
5003, 5009, 5011, 5021, 5023, 5039, 5051, 5059, 5077, 5081, 5087, 5099, 5101, 5107, 5113, 5119, 5147, 5153, 5167, 5171, 5179, 5189, 5197, 5209, 5227, 5231, 5233, 5237, 5261, 5273, 5279, 5281, 5297, 5303, 5309, 5323, 5333, 5347, 5351, 5381, 5387, 5393, 5399, 5407, 5413, 5417, 5419, 5431, 5437, 5441, 5443, 5449, 5471, 5477, 5479, 5483, 5501, 5503, 5507, 5519, 5521, 5527, 5531, 5557, 5563, 5569, 5573, 5581, 5591, 5623, 5639, 5641, 5647, 5651, 5653, 5657, 5659, 5669, 5683, 5689, 5693, 5701, 5711, 5717, 5737, 5741, 5743, 5749, 5779, 5783, 5791, 5801, 5807, 5813, 5821, 5827, 5839, 5843, 5849, 5851, 5857, 5861, 5867, 5869, 5879, 5881, 5897, 5903, 5923, 5927, 5939, 5953, 5981, 5987

References

Integers